William Epstein,  (July 10, 1912 – February 9, 2001) was a Canadian international civil servant who worked at the United Nations for 54 years and was considered an expert on disarmament.

Born in Calgary, Alberta, Epstein attended the University of Alberta and the London School of Economics. He was Director of the UN Disarmament Division in the United Nations Secretariat and worked with the first seven United Nations Secretaries-General.

In 1976, his book The Last Chance: Nuclear Proliferation and Arms Control was published.

In 1989, he was made an Officer of the Order of Canada, Canada's highest civilian honor.

References

1912 births
2001 deaths
Alumni of the London School of Economics
20th-century Canadian civil servants
Officers of the Order of Canada
People from Calgary
Canadian officials of the United Nations
University of Alberta alumni